Giacomo Conti may refer to:

Giacomo Conti (artist) (1813–1888), Italian painter
Giacomo Conti (bobsledder) (1918–1992), Italian bobsledder
Giacomo Conti (footballer) (born 1999), Sammarinese footballer